Wheat mildew is a wheat disease that affects the ear, and is brought on by causes somewhat similar to those that cause blight, though at a more advanced period of the season. If this disorder comes on immediately after the first appearance of the ear, the straw is also affected—but if the grain is nearly or fully formed, injury to the straw is less discernible.  Wheat may mildew where the straw is perfectly fresh, but only rarely. A severe mildew, however, retards further grain and straw maturation and leads to death. Something akin to mildew is the gum, which, in all warm moist seasons, attaches itself to the ear, and often causes considerable damage. All these different disorders are generally accompanied by insects, and by minute parasitic vegetable growths, considered by many to be the cause of the damage. Their appearance, however, may justly be attributed to the diseased state of the plant; for wherever putrefaction takes place, either in animal or vegetable substances, the presence of these parasites will never be wanting. 

Another disorder that affects wheat is brought on by excessive heat, which makes the plants suffer from malnutrition, and become sickly and feeble. In this atrophic state a kind of dust gathers on the stalks and leaves, which increases with the disease, till the plant is in a great measure worn out and exhausted. The only remedy in this case, and it is one that cannot easily be administered by the hand of man, is a plentiful supply of moisture, by which, if it is received before consumption is too far advanced, the crop is benefited in a degree proportional to the extent of nourishment received, and the stage at which the disease has arrived. 

Some people have recommended using blighted and mildewed wheat for seed. This, however may be hazardous. Light or defective wheat does vegetate and produce a plant, but the plant may be of poor quality and incapable of withstanding winter blasts.

See also
 QoI
 Strobilurins
 Powdery mildew

References
Much of the text is taken from the Household Cyclopedia of 1881:

Wheat diseases
Fungal plant pathogens and diseases